The London Organising Committee of the Olympic and Paralympic Games (LOCOG) was the organisation responsible for overseeing the planning and development of the 2012 Summer Olympic and Paralympic Games. It was jointly established by the UK Government's Department for Culture, Media and Sport, the Mayor of London and the British Olympic Association and was structured as a private company limited by guarantee. LOCOG worked closely with the publicly funded Olympic Delivery Authority (ODA), which is responsible for the planning and construction of new venues and infrastructure.

The organising committee, which was not responsible for building permanent venues, reported spent £2.38 billion since winning the bid in 2005 and generated £2.41 billion. On 30 May 2013, it handed back to the government, Britain's Olympic committee and other beneficiaries a surplus of £30 million from the 2012 Games. The British Olympic Association received £5.3 million, the British Paralympic Association £2.6 million, and £20 million was returned to the Department for Culture, Media and Sport.

Formation
On 6 July 2005, the International Olympic Committee (IOC) chose London as the host city for the 2012 Olympic Games. After the success of the London bid, LOCOG was formed to continue the work started by the bidding team. LOCOG was officially designated as the organisers of the Games at its first board meeting on 7 October 2005.

Board members
The board members were:
 The Lord Coe - Chairman 
 Sir Keith Mills - Deputy Chairman 
 The Princess Royal
 Sir Charles Allen CBE
 Dr Muhammad Abdul Bari MBE
 Sir Philip Craven MBE
 Paul Deighton - CEO 
 Jonathan Edwards CBE 
 The Lord Hall of Birkenhead CBE
 Andrew Hunt 
 Justin King CBE
 Stephen Lovegrove 
 The Lord Moynihan 
 Tim Reddish OBE
 Sir Craig Reedie CBE 
 Martin Stewart
 Sir Robin Wales
 Neil Wood MBE
 Adam Pengilly

Members of the IOC from the host country are required by IOC rules to be on the organising committee board, as well as representatives of the host Olympic association and Paralympic association.

Senior team
The senior team comprised:

 Doug Arnot, Director of Games Operations, London 2012
 Jackie Brock-Doyle, Director of Communications and Public Affairs 
 James Bulley, Director of Venues and Infrastructure 
 Lord Coe, Chairman
 Paul Deighton, Chief Executive Officer 
 Richard George, Director of Transport
 Nigel Garfitt, Director of Villages and Games Services
 Chris Holmes MBE, Director of Paralympic Integration 
 Sue Hunt, Director of Strategic Programmes
 Debbie Jevans, Director of Sport 
 Sir Ian Johnston, Director of Security and Resilience
 Terry Miller, General Counsel 
 Danny Fisher, Legacy Development Director
 Sir Keith Mills, Deputy Chairman
 Bill Morris LVO, Director of Culture, Ceremonies and Education 
 Gerry Pennell OBE, Chief Information Officer (CIO)
 Jean Tomlin, Human Resources (HR) Director
 Chris Townsend, Commercial Director 
 Neil Wood, Chief Financial Officer
 Mike Loynd, Director of Readiness and C3

See also 
 Legacy Trust UK

References

External links
 
 

2012 Summer Olympics
2012 Summer Paralympics
Organising Committees for the Olympic Games
Organising Committees for the Paralympic Games
2005 establishments in the United Kingdom
Private companies limited by guarantee of the United Kingdom
Summer Olympics
Sport in London